Login.gov is a single sign-on solution for US government websites. It enables users to log in to services from numerous government agencies using the same username and password. Login.gov was jointly developed by 18F and the US Digital Service. The initiative was announced in a blog post in May 2016 and the new system was launched in April 2017 as a replacement for Connect.Gov.

Further reading

See also 
 NSTIC
 GOV.UK Verify

External links

References 

Identity management systems
Federated identity
E-government in the United States